The Wills River is a river of the southern West Coast region of New Zealand's South Island. It flows west to reach the Haast River 10 kilometres north of the Haast Pass.

The river was named by Julius von Haast when he searched for a crossing from Otago to the West Coast. It is named for William John Wills of the Burke and Wills expedition. The nearby Burke River is named for Robert O'Hara Burke.

See also
List of rivers of New Zealand

References

Rivers of the West Coast, New Zealand
Westland District
Rivers of New Zealand